Sze Fong Shan, located in Tai Po District of the New Territories, is the fourth highest peak in Hong Kong. With a height of 784 m (2,572 ft), it is northeast of Tai Mo Shan. The Eighth Stage of the MacLehose Trail passes near it.

Name 
The Cantonese name Sze Fong Shan (Chinese: 四方山; Cantonese Yale: sei fōng shāan, Jyutping: Sei3 Fong1 Saan1) literally means "Square Mountain".

Subpeak
Chau Ma Kong is a subpeak northnortheast of Sze Fong Shan and east of Ng Tung Chai waterfalls.

See also
 List of mountains, peaks and hills in Hong Kong

References

Mountains, peaks and hills of Hong Kong
Tai Po District